Lepidophthalmus is a genus of ghost shrimp.

Species
Lepidophthalmus contains the following species:
Lepidophthalmus bocourti (A. Milne-Edwards, 1870)
Lepidophthalmus eiseni Holmes, 1904
Lepidophthalmus grandidieri (Coutière, 1899)
Lepidophthalmus jamaicense (Schmitt, 1935)
Lepidophthalmus louisianensis (Schmitt, 1935)
Lepidophthalmus manningi Feder & Staton, 2000
Lepidophthalmus rafai Felder & Manning, 1998
Lepidophthalmus richardi Felder & Manning, 1997
Lepidophthalmus rosae (Nobili, 1904)
Lepidophthalmus sinuensis Lemaitre & Rodrigues, 1991
Lepidophthalmus siriboia Felder & Rodrigues, 1993
Lepidophthalmus socotrensis Sakai & Apel, 2002
Lepidophthalmus tridentatus (Von Martens, 1868)
Lepidophthalmus turneranus (White, 1861)
Only one species is known from the fossil record: Remains attributable to the extant species Lepidophthalmus jamaicense have been found in Upper Pleistocene deposits at Port Morant Harbour in the parish of St. Thomas, Jamaica.

References

Thalassinidea
Decapod genera